The New Democratic Party of Quebec elected a permanent leader on January 21, 2018 to lead it into the 2018 provincial election. Interim leader Pierre Ducasse announced he would not be a candidate in the leadership election.

Timeline

September 1, 2017 - Nomination period opens.
October 20, 2017 - Nomination deadline.
November 25, 2017, 2:30 pm - Candidates debate in Montreal.
December 9, 2017, 2:30 pm - Candidates debate in Gatineau.
December 16, 2017 - English debate in Montreal.
January 21, 2018 - Leadership election is held.

Candidates

Raymond Côté 

Background

Former MP for Beauport—Limoilou (2011-2015).

Raphaël Fortin 

Background

Candidate in the 2015 federal election in Pierre-Boucher—Les Patriotes—Verchères and 2008 in Verchères—Les Patriotes.

Endorsements

Paulina Ayala, former Member of Parliament for Honoré-Mercier

Declined
 Denis Blanchette, president of the Quebec NDP, NDPQ candidate in the Louis-Hébert provincial by-election (October 2, 2017), former MP for Louis-Hébert (2011-2015).
 Pierre Ducasse, interim leader (2014–present), federal NDP Quebec lieutenant (2003-2007), Associate President of the New Democratic Party (2000-2002), ran in the 2003 New Democratic Party leadership election and placed fifth.

Results
 Raphaël Fortin 62%
 Raymond Côté 38%

Total votes cast: 397 votes

Turnout: 67.51%

Source:

References

Political party leadership elections in Quebec
Quebec
New Democratic
Leadership
New Democratic Party of Quebec leadership election